William C. "Dark Night" "Midnight" Smith, also listed as Marshall Smith, was an American baseball pitcher and first baseman in the Negro leagues. He played from 1920 to 1924 with several teams.

Career
Smith was a native of Richmond, Virginia. He pitched for the Brooklyn Royal Giants in 1920. After two years with the Baltimore Black Sox and a season with the Harrisburg Giants, he was signed by the Homestead Grays in April of 1924.

Smith also pitched for Chappie Johnson's All-Stars in at least 1925 and 1927.

References

External links
  and Seamheads

Baltimore Black Sox players
Brooklyn Royal Giants players
Harrisburg Giants players
Homestead Grays players
Year of birth unknown
Year of death unknown
Baseball players from Richmond, Virginia
Baseball pitchers